Rogue Male are a British heavy metal band, formed in 1984.

Rogue Male was the brainchild of Northern Ireland-born singer and guitarist Jim Lyttle, who had previously been in the Northern Irish punk rock band Pretty Boy Floyd and The Gems. Moving to London in the late 1970s, he decided to put together a band that would mix punk rock styles and aggression, with the more heavy metal sounds of the NWOBHM bands of the time. The band signed to the UK heavy metal label Music for Nations and subsequently Elektra in the US., Shortly afterwards, the band were invited to appear on the E.C.T. (Extra Celestial Transmission) Heavy Metal music programme on England's Channel 4 where they performed two songs live on 19 April 1985.

The first Rogue Male album, First Visit, was recorded by Lyttle on guitar and vocals, John Fraser-Binnie on lead guitar, Phil Clark on bass, and Steve Kingsley on drums., Kingsley was later replaced by Danny Fury., The album was produced by Steve James. Rogue Male toured the UK/Europe and the US in support of it. Kerrang! magazine in the UK gave the band several features, and a front cover article. "All Over You" was released as a 12-inch single. The second album Animal Man, was released a year later., Rogue Male subsequently dropped their record companies  and started legal proceedings.  The 1980s incarnation of the band played their final show in late 1987.

Both the original albums were re-released on the Polish label Metal Mind records in 2007. In an interview in the March 2009 edition of Classic Rock Magazine, Lyttle stated that he had recently written, arranged, recorded and produced a new Rogue Male album. This featured Bernie Tormé on guitar on some tracks with John McCoy on bass and Robin Guy on drums and was called Nail It.  A new track, "Cold Blooded Man" appeared on the CD which accompanied the magazine. Original lead guitarist John Fraser Binnie subsequently rejoined the band and a new DVD entitled Liar was recorded and released.

Discography
Studio albums 
First Visit (1985) Music for Nations MFN40 /Elektra Records 96 04231
Animal Man (1986) Music for Nations MFN68 / Elektra Records
First Visit (2007) Re-release on Metal Mind Productions
Animal Man (2007) Re-release on Metal Mind Productions
Nail It (2009) RM2K Music RMCD01

Singles 
"All Over You" (1985) - 12" Music for Nations 12KUT114  / Elektra Records
"All Over You (full version)", "All Over You (edit)", "The Real Me"
"Belfast (1986) - 12" Music for Nations 12KUT122
"Belfast", "Rough Tough (Pretty Too)", "Take No Shit"

Compilation albums 
"Crazy Motorcycle" on Welcome to the Metal Zone (1985) Music for Nations MFN49
"Belfast" on MFN: The Singles Album (1986) Music for Nations MFN71
"The Passing" on Nightmare on Carnaby St'' (1988) Music for Nations MFN83

References

External links
Official Website
Official YouTube page

English heavy metal musical groups
New Wave of British Heavy Metal musical groups
Music for Nations artists
Musical groups from London